State Route 338 (SR 338) is a primary state highway in the U.S. state of Virginia. Known as Hillwood Avenue, the state highway runs  from U.S. Route 29 (US 29) and SR 237 in Falls Church east to US 50, SR 7, and SR 613 at Seven Corners.

Route description

SR 338 begins at an intersection with US 29 and SR 237 (Washington Street) in the independent city of Falls Church. There is no access from southbound US 29 to eastbound SR 338; that movement is made via Annandale Road at the intersection immediately to the east of the terminus. SR 338 heads east as a two-lane undivided street through a residential area. Shortly after leaving Falls Church and entering Fairfax County, the state highway reaches its eastern terminus at a seven-way junction with US 50 (Arlington Boulevard), SR 7 (Leesburg Pike), and SR 613, which heads north as Wilson Boulevard and south as Sleepy Hollow Road. SR 338 merges into SR 7 in the direction of Alexandria. Traffic from SR 338 follows eastbound SR 7, which provides access to both directions of SR 613 and to US 50, which passes under and interacts with the mass of intersections through a diamond interchange. The mass of intersections allows access to westbound SR 7 back toward Falls Church.

Major intersections

References

External links

Virginia Highways Project: VA 338

338
State Route 338
State Route 338
State Route 338